Julien Leghait (born 23 March 1994) is a French footballer who plays for French club SC Feignies as an attacking midfielder. Leghait is a France youth international having represented his nation at under-18 level.

Career
Leghait made his professional debut on 3 August 2012 in the Lens's opening league match of the 2012–13 campaign against Arles-Avignon.

Completed his playing career due to injury in October 2019 at Feignies Aulnoye FC.

References

External links 
 
 
 
 

1994 births
French footballers
Valenciennes FC players
RC Lens players
Ligue 2 players
Living people
France youth international footballers
Sportspeople from Valenciennes
Association football midfielders
Footballers from Hauts-de-France